Palongcuo or Palung Co is a high-altitude saltwater lake in Zhongba County in the Tibet region of China.

Location 
The area around Palungcuo mainly consists of grasslands as natural pasture. It stretches 20.4 kilometers in a north-south direction and 12.1 kilometers in an east-west direction.

The lake is the southern end point of Palongcuo-Cangmucuo Fault Zone.

Flora and fauna 
In 2008, for the first time a snow leopard was spotted in the southern grassland of the lake.

References

Lakes of Tibet